The 36th Boat Race took place on 5 April 1879.   The Boat Race is an annual side-by-side rowing race between crews from the Universities of Oxford and Cambridge along the River Thames.  Each crew contained four Blues.  In a race umpired by former Oxford rower Joseph William Chitty, Cambridge led all the way, and won by a margin of three lengths in a time of 21 minutes 18 seconds.  The victory took the overall record to 18–17 in Oxford's favour.

Background

The Boat Race is a side-by-side rowing competition between the University of Oxford (sometimes referred to as the "Dark Blues") and the University of Cambridge (sometimes referred to as the "Light Blues").  The race was first held in 1829, and since 1845 has taken place on the  Championship Course on the River Thames in southwest London.   Cambridge went into the race as reigning champions, having won the previous year's race by ten lengths.  However Oxford held the overall lead, with 18 victories to Cambridge's 16 (excluding the "dead heat" of 1877).

Cambridge's coaches were James Brooks Close (who rowed for the Light Blues in the 1872, 1873 and 1874 races), Herbert Edward Rhodes (who took part in four races between 1873 and 1876) and Robert John Spurrell (a Blue in 1878).  Oxford were coached by William Grenfell (who had rowed for the Dark Blues in 1877 and was the non-rowing president of Oxford University Boat Club).

The race was umpired by Joseph William Chitty who had rowed for Oxford twice in 1849 (in the March and December races) and the 1852 race, while the starter was Edward Searle.

Crews
The Cambridge crew weighed an average of 12 st 0.5 lb (76.2 kg),  more than their opponents.  Oxford's crew contained four former Blues, including H. P. Marriott who was rowing in his fifth consecutive Boat Race.  Similarly, Cambridge saw four Blues return to their crew, including cox George Latham Davies who was steering the Light Blue boat for the fifth time.  Rower and author George Drinkwater stated that "neither of the crews this year was up to the high standard of the winning crews in the past few years".

The Cambridge crew included the only non-British participant in the race, Australian rower Charles Fairbairn. He was born in Victoria and was educated at Geelong Grammar School before matriculating at Jesus College.

Race

Oxford won the toss and elected to start from the Surrey station, handing the Middlesex side of the river to Cambridge.  Cambridge made the better start and were clear of Oxford within the first 90 seconds of the race. Despite a lower stroke rate, the Light Blues had extended their lead to three lengths by Hammersmith Bridge.  Encountering rough water in Corney Reach, Cambridge slowed and allowed Oxford to gain on them, but as the crews passed under Barnes Bridge into smoother water, the Light Blues reasserted their dominance.  They passed the finishing post three lengths ahead in a time of 21 minutes 18 seconds.  It was Cambridge's first victory since the 1876 race, and their seventh in the last ten races, taking the overall record to 18–17 in Oxford's favour.

References
Notes

Bibliography

External links
 Official website

The Boat Race
1879 in English sport
April 1879 sports events